Alzamay is a town in Nizhneudinsky District of Irkutsk Oblast, Russia, located on the Toporok River (Angara River's basin)  northwest of Irkutsk, the administrative center of the oblast, and  from Nizhneudinsk, the administrative center of the district. Population:

History
It was founded in 1899 as a settlement around Alzamay railway station. Town status was granted to it in 1955.

Administrative and municipal status
Within the framework of administrative divisions, Alzamay is subordinated to Nizhneudinsky District. As a municipal division, the town of Alzamay is incorporated within Nizhneudinsky Municipal District as Alzamayskoye Urban Settlement.

References

Notes

Sources

Registry of the Administrative-Territorial Formations of Irkutsk Oblast

External links
Official website of Alzamay 
Directory of organizations in Alzamay 

Cities and towns in Irkutsk Oblast